Chapel of the Pines Crematory is a crematory and columbarium located at 1605 South Catalina Street, Los Angeles, in the U.S. state of California, in the historic West Adams District a short distance southwest of Downtown. It is beside Angelus-Rosedale Cemetery, one street east, at the southwest corner of Catalina and Venice Boulevard.

Established in 1903, this domed structure, which looks like an observatory, provides crematory services and columbarium inurnment. It is the final resting place for the cremains of a number of noted persons.

List of notable interments
(Note: This is a partial list.)

Use the following alphabetical links to find someone.

A
Ted Adams (1890–1973), actor
Broncho Billy Anderson (1882–1971), actor (private vault)
George Anderson (1886–1948), actor
Lionel Atwill (1885–1946), actor (private vault)
Arthur Aylesworth (1883–1946), actor

B
Ross Bagdasarian, Sr. (David Seville) (1919–1972), musician, actor
Bob Bailey (1913–1983) radio actor 
Alma Bennett (1904–1958), actress
Frank Brownlee (1874–1948), actor
Nigel Bruce (1895–1953), actor
Mae Busch (1891–1946), actress

C
Leonard Carey (1887–1977), actor
Louise Carver (1869–1956), actress
Helen Chandler (1906–1965), actress (private vault)
Parley Parker Christensen (1869-1954), Utah and California politician, Esperantist
Colin Clive (1900–1937), actor (cenotaph here, but ashes were scattered at sea)
June Collyer (1906–1968), actress
Heinie Conklin (1889-1959), actor
Tom Conway (1904–1967), actor (private vault)
Cecil Cunningham (1888–1959), actress
Dorothy Christy (1906-1976), actress

D
J. Searle Dawley (1877-1949), film director, screenwriter, stage actor, and playwright
Edgar Dearing (1893–1974), actor
William Desmond (1878–1949), actor (private vault)
Margaret Dumont (1882–1965), actress

E
Stuart Erwin (1903–1967), actor
Anthony Eustrel (1903–1979), actor
Renee Evans (1908–1971), actress
Ernest Evers (1874–1945), film actor

F
Bess Flowers (1898–1984), actress
Maude Fulton (1881–1950), actress, screenwriter (private vault)
Noel Francis (1906-1959), actress

G
Florence Gill (1877–1965), voice actress
Edmund Gwenn (1875–1959), actor (private vault)

H
Raymond Hackett (1902–1958), actor
Jean Hagen (1923–1977), actress
Hobart Henley (1887–1964), actor
Halliwell Hobbes (1877–1962), actor
Arthur Hoyt (1874–1953), actor
Warren Hymer (1906–1948), actor

I
Lloyd Ingraham (1874–1956), actor, director, and screenwriter

J
Julanne Johnston (1900–1988), actress
Justine Johnstone (1895–1982), actress

L
Gregory La Cava (1892–1952), director
Lew Landers (1901–1962), motion picture director
William LeBaron (1883–1958), motion picture producer
Mitchell Leisen (1898–1972), comedy director
Montagu Love (1877–1943), actor
Wilfred Lucas (1871–1940), actor, director, screenwriter (private vault)

M
J. Farrell MacDonald (1875–1952), actor and director
Herbert Marshall (1890–1966), actor
Edward Martindel (1876–1955), actor
Sarah Y. Mason (1896–1980), screenwriter and script supervisor (private vault)
Torben Meyer (1884–1975), actor
Gertrude Michael (1910–1965), actress
Geneva Mitchell (1908–1949), actress
Thomas Mitchell (1892–1962), actor
Leonard Mudie (1883–1965), actor

N
Alan Napier (1903–1988), actor (cremated here, ashes scattered in his former residence's garden)
Ray Nazarro (1902–1986), film director
Tom Neal (1914–1972), actor, convicted of manslaughter in the death of his estranged wife

O
Willis H. O'Brien (1886–1962), filmmaker
Vivien Oakland (1895–1958), actress
Philip Ober (1902–1982), actor
 Garry Owen  (1902-1951), actor

P
Franklin Parker (1900–1962), actor
Stuart Paton (1883–1944), motion picture director (private vaultage)
Eileen Percy (1900–1973), actress
George P. Putnam (1887–1950), publisher, author and explorer, husband of Amelia Earhart

R
Warner Richmond (1886–1948), actor
Rachel Roberts (1927–1980), actress
Harry Ruby (1895–1974), screenwriter, songwriter and composer (private vault)

S
William Selig (1864–1948), pioneer movie studio owner
Ann Sheridan (1915–1967), actress (originally inurned here, ashes were relocated to Hollywood Forever Cemetery in 2005)
Jay Silverheels (1912–1980), actor (cremated here, ashes were scattered on his Six Nations reservation in Canada)
Herbert Standing Sr. (1846–1923), actor
Vernon Steele (1882–1955), actor
Harry Stubbs (1874–1950), actor
Noel Francis (1906–1959), actress

T
Zeffie Tilbury (1863–1950), actress
Florence Turner (1885–1946), actress, producer, and screenwriter (private vault)

V
Philip Van Zandt (1904–1958), actor (private vault)

W
H. B. Warner (1875–1958), actor (private vault)
E. Allyn Warren (1874–1940), actor
Lyle R. Wheeler (1905–1990), movie art director
Kathlyn Williams (1888–1960), actress, screenwriter

Y
Cy Young, animator

The British Commonwealth War Graves Commission commemorates one Commonwealth serviceman whose ashes are inurned here, a soldier of the Canadian Army of World War I.

References

Cemeteries in Los Angeles
Burials at Chapel of the Pines Crematory
1903 establishments in California
West Adams, Los Angeles